Susana Alejandra Isabel Jiménez Schuster (born 26 July 1969) is a Chilean politician and business manager.

From 1995 to 1997, Jiménez Schuster worked as an economist in the Central Bank of Chile's Research Division.

After her spell during the second government of Sebastián Piñera (2018–2022), she assumed on 28 May 2020 as vice-president of Sociedad de Fomento Fabril (SOFOFA). Likewise, Jiménez Schuster also arrived Soprole's board in April 2020.

References

1969 births
Living people
Pontifical Catholic University of Chile alumni
University for Development alumni
21st-century Chilean politicians
21st-century Chilean women politicians
Ministers of Energy of Chile
Women government ministers of Chile
People from Santiago